Coleophora coronillae is a moth of the family Coleophoridae. It is found from Germany to Italy and Bulgaria and from Lithuania to the Iberian Peninsula. It is also found in southern Russia, Transcaucasia, central Asia and Iran.

The larvae feed on Coronilla varia. They create a dull, two-valved tubular silken case with a mouth angle of about 45°. Larvae can be found from September to May.

References

coronillae
Moths described in 1849
Moths of Europe
Moths of Asia